The Ruthenian Catholic Archeparchy of Smolensk was an archeparchy of the Metropolis of Kiev, Galicia and all Ruthenia in the Ruthenian Uniate Church from 1625 to 1778. It was situated in the Polish–Lithuanian Commonwealth in what is today the Smolensk Oblast of the Russian Federation. It used the Byzantine Rite in its services. It was also known as the Ruthenian Catholic Archdiocese of Smolensk or Smoleńsk of the Ruthenians.

History 
It was established in 1625 on Polish–Lithuanian Commonwealth territory, previously without proper Ruthenian Catholic jurisdiction. Earlier in 1611 there was established Roman Catholic diocese of Smolensk.

It was suppressed in 1778, without a successor jurisdiction, at its last incumbent's death.

Episcopal ordinaries
'' Eparchs (Archbishops) of Smolensk
 Leo Kreuza-Revuskyj = Lev Revuckyj Krevza, a Vilnius Archmandrite (1625 – death 1639)
 Andrej Kvasninskyj-Zlotyj = Andrzej Kwaśniński-Złoty (1640 – 1654), next Bishop of Pinsk-Turaŭ of the Ruthenians (in Belarus) (1654 – death 1665)
 Michael Pashkovskyj = Myxajlo Paškovskyj (1666 – death 1670)
 Mytrofan Drutskyj Sokolynskyj = Mytrofan Druckyj Sokolynskyj (1671 – death 1690)
 Jurij Malejevskyj (1690 – death 1696)
 Joasaphat Hutorovych = Josafat Hutorovyč (1697 – death 1702)
 Gedeon Shumljanskyj = Hedeon Šumljanškyj (1703 – death 1705)
 Michael Tarnovskyj = Myxajlo Tarnovskyj (1714? – death 1718.02.18)
 Leo Drutskyj Sokolynskyj = Lavrentij Druckyj Sokolynskyj, Basilian Order of Saint Josaphat (O.S.B.M.) (1719 – death 1727.05.15)
 Antin Tomylovyc = Antin Tomylovyč (1736? – death 1745.04.23)
 Tsezarij Stebnovskyj = Cezarij Stebnovskyj (1757? – death 1762)
 Heraclius Lisanski = Iraklij Lisanski (1763 – death 1771.03.14)
 Josyf Lepkovskyj (1771.03.14 – death 1778), succeeding as former Coadjutor Bishop of Smoleńsk of the Ruthenians (? – 1771.03.14)

See also 
 List of Catholic dioceses in Russia

Sources and external links 
 GCatholic
 catholic-hierarchy

Metropolis of Kiev, Galicia and all Ruthenia (Ruthenian Uniate Church)
Smolensk
Smolensk
Smolensk
Religious organizations established in 1625
1625 establishments in the Polish–Lithuanian Commonwealth
1620s establishments in Russia
1778 disestablishments in the Russian Empire
Religious organizations disestablished in the 18th century
Eparchies of the Ruthenian Uniate Church